Clover Township may refer to:
 Clover Township, Henry County, Illinois
 Clover Township, Pine County, Minnesota
 Clover Township, Mahnomen County, Minnesota
 Clover Township, Hubbard County, Minnesota
 Clover Township, Clearwater County, Minnesota
 Clover Township, Jefferson County, Pennsylvania

Township name disambiguation pages